North-West East 3 was an English Rugby Union league which was at the twelve tier of the domestic competition and was available to teams in Greater Manchester and Lancashire.  Promoted teams moved up to North-West East 2 and, as it was the lowest ranked league in the region, there was no relegation.

North-West East 3 ran for three seasons from 1987 to 1992 until it was cancelled by the RFU as part of their north-west league restructuring.  All teams were promoted into Lancashire North 2 for the 1992–93 season.

Original teams

When the division was introduced in 1989 it contained the following teams:

Atherton - N/A (new to league)
Bowden - relegated from North-West East 2 (12th)
Holmes Chapel - N/A (new to league)
Lostock - N/A (new to league)
Oldham College - relegated from North-West East 2 (11th)
Shell Carrington - transferred from North-West West 3 (11th)
Wigan Tech - transferred from North-West West 3 (8th)

North-West East 3 honours

Number of league titles

Marple (1)
Thornton-Cleveleys (1)
Wigan Tech (1)

Notes

References

See also
 North Lancashire 1
 North Lancashire 2
 Lancashire RFU
 English Rugby Union Leagues
 English rugby union system
 Rugby union in England

Defunct rugby union leagues in England